Projet Orange was a Quebecois musical band from Quebec City, Quebec. They performed britpop-inspired rock.

Profile 
Formed in Quebec City by brothers Jean-Christophe and Jean-Sébastien Boies, Projet Orange played a britpop-like, catchy and flowing sound. Their success began when they won the Quebec musical contest L'Empire des futures stars.

The name came from an early show of multiple groups in which the band was partook.  It was required to enter the name of one's band on a sheet, where the names of the bands would be preceded by "Projet:" (Project:).  After seeing the orange coat of a fellow member, one band player entered Orange next to the term and thus the name was born.

In 2002, member Jean-Sébastien developed a blood disease, forcing the band to take a half-year hiatus and halt songwriting.  The first album being entirely francophone, the second, in order to introduce the band to the English-speaking world (especially Canada), includes eleven pieces in English out of fifteen.  It was created with the aid of singer-songwriter Simon Wilcox and producer Gavin Brown.  The album is partly inspired by Jean-Sébastien's ordeal, as well as the September 11, 2001 attacks.

In 2004, the band released the album Megaphobe. The album's lead single, "Tell All Your Friends", reached No. 8 on Canada's Rock chart.

The band made its last appearance on stage at the Zaphod Beeblebrox in Ottawa, 8 March 2007. Jean-Christophe said "This is our last show ever".  They played a few new songs, as well as some songs out of the second album.  Their very last live song was "Jamais de mal".  Despite an article published in Le Droit on 8 March, mentioning a third album is ready to go, lead singer Jean-Christophe said about one of the new song "This is a new song, well, this is as far as this song will go". Jean-Sébastien was absent on the stage.

Lead Singer Jean-Christophe is rumoured to have left the band to work on a new project "Buro 40".

Members
Jean-Christophe Boies (Rhythm Guitar, lead vocals)
Jean-Sébastien Boies (Rhythm Guitar, piano, backing vocals)
Louis "Luis" Lalancette (bass guitar, backing vocals)
Stéphane Gaudreau (drums)
Guillaume Doiron (Lead Guitar)

Discography

Studio albums
Projet Orange (21 July 2001)
Megaphobe (12 October 2004)

Singles

See also
List of Quebec musicians
Music of Quebec
Culture of Quebec
Britpop

References

External links
Fan website

Musical groups from Quebec City
Canadian alternative rock groups
Musical groups established in 2000
Musical groups disestablished in 2007
English-language musical groups from Quebec